Events during the year 1190 in Italy.

Deaths 
Roger of Andria, supporter of Henry VI, Holy Roman Emperor and himself a former contender to Sicilian throne against Tancred, King of Sicily.

References

Years of the 12th century in Italy
Italy
Italy